Alberto Carlos Garzón Espinosa (born 9 October 1985) is a Spanish politician and economist, currently the Spanish Minister of Consumer Affairs. He has been a member of the Communist Party of Spain (PCE) and United Left (Izquierda Unida, IU) since 2003. In the 2011 general election, he was elected as an MP within that coalition. He has been the Secretary of Constituent Process in IU from 2014 to 2016, and in 2015, he was elected as an IU candidate for that year's general election. He is a researcher in University Pablo de Olavide in Sevilla.

Biography

Family origins and youth 
He is the son of Alberto Garzón Blanco, a teacher of Geography and History in Málaga, and Isabel Espinosa Casares, a pharmacist from Cenicero, La Rioja. The two met on a summer trip in Rincón de la Victoria. He spent his early years in Logroño, where he was born. When he was three, the family moved to the Sevilian town of Marchena, where his father had obtained a job as a professor.

In 1994, the family returned to Rincón de la Victoria. Garzón attended the Manuel Laza Palacios elementary school and the Ben Al Jatib secondary school. He liked football and attempted, unsuccessfully, to make his way into Sports Club Rincón.

University stage 
Garzón initially studied Administration and Management of Corporations at the Faculty of Economic and Business Sciences of the University of Malaga, but the following year, he changed to Economics. When he was 18 years old, he joined United Left The Greens-Andalucía.

In 2004, he participated in the foundation of Students for a Critical Economy, an association of which he was president until 2008, and that was in the same line as the Post-autistic economics movement born in France a few years earlier. The purpose of that group was academic and militant, since it denounced "the unique thinking and the intellectual emptiness that reigns in the teaching of economics" at the same time as it participated in social movements such like the Social Forum Another Malaga of 2004. The association would incorporate first as "Left-wing Students", a university association of a left-wing and anticapitalist nature, and later, in the platform of "Critical Students", a union of many progressive groups. Criticism Economy Malaga stood in the students' elections, obtaining 64% of the votes in 2008.

UL listed Garzón fifth on their candidate list for the 2007 Spanish local elections.

Garzón later earned his Master's in International Economy and Development at the School of Business & Economic Sciences at the Complutense University of Madrid. It was here that Garzón Sampedro, who Garzón would later publicly thank for being the basis of his school of thought. Other politicians from UL have enrolled within the University's School of Business & Economic Sciences, including Eddy Sánchez, as well as several economic advisors to Unidos Podemos.

Member of the Congress of Deputies 
Garzón was first elected as a Deputy in the Spanish Parliament on the IU list for Málaga, following the 2011 Spanish general election. He was the youngest member of the House of Deputies during that session.

In January 2013, he was elected as a member of UL's Federal Executive Committee.

Minister of Consumer Affairs 
Garzón was appointed Minister of Consumer Affairs on 13 January 2020.

In October 2021, Garzón announced that the ministry would ban the advertising of several categories of junk food to children under 16. Such advertising would be forbidden on television, on the radio, online, in movie theaters, and in newspapers. Affected foods include candy, energy bars, cookies, cake, juice, energy drinks, and ice cream. The ban is to take effect during 2022.

References

1985 births
Communist Party of Spain politicians
Leaders of political parties in Spain
Living people
Marxian economists
Members of the 10th Congress of Deputies (Spain)
Members of the 11th Congress of Deputies (Spain)
Members of the 12th Congress of Deputies (Spain)
People from Logroño
United Left (Spain) politicians
Members of the 13th Congress of Deputies (Spain)
Members of the 14th Congress of Deputies (Spain)